is a casual indie 2D visual novel, developed by Life a Little for Microsoft Windows.

References

External links

2013 video games
Visual novels
Casual games
Indie video games
Video games developed in Japan
Windows games
Windows-only games